Sangeeta Boochra is an eponymous fashion label founded in 1994, named after Indian jewelry designer Sangeeta Biochar. The label is known for its traditional and tribal designer jewelry collections.

History and description 
In 1897, Seth Kistoor Chand Boochra at Jaipur, India started Bullion Trading Company, primarily dealing with the trading and conventional commerce of silver. Seth Kistoor served as the president of the organization for four decades and he was known as 'The Silver King of India'. During 1960, his son Seth Lalit Kumar Boochra converted the bullion trading business  into a jewelers manufacturing unit. In 1994, Sangeeta Boochra joined her father in law's business and created the label Sangeeta Boochra.

Sangeeta was born at Sujangarh, from where later she shifted with her family to Guwahati. She married Sudeep Boochra, who is a gem exporter and presently the director of Bullion association limited. From 2016, She is working as the managing director of both Silverr Centre and her eponymous fashion brand Sangeeta Boochra. Currently her son Abhineet Boochra serves as the one of the directors and the spoke person of the brand. The label presently has 45 stores pan India with three manufacturing units and design studios.

The jewelries of Sangeeta Boochra are found to be worn and endorsed by several Hollywood and Bollywood actresses and celebrities. The jewelry label made appearances in Bollywood movies like Luka Chuppi, Veere Di Wedding, The Zoya Factor etc. The label first appeared at Lakme Fashion Week in 2011.

Additional sources 

 Salon International, May 2020, Vol 12, No 5,
 Haute Brides and Honeymoons: June July 2015. N.p., Pioneer Book Co. Pvt. Ltd., 2015.
 Solitaire, May 2018, Page 57
 New Woman: October 2015. N.p., Pioneer Book Co. Pvt. Ltd., 2015. Page 66
 Elle India, January 2018 
 Perfect Woman, Vol-VIII, Issue V, May 2019, Page 66
 Verve, Oct-Nov 2019, Page 126-135
 Art of Jewelry , Vol.19, Issue 2, Designer of the Month, Page 79
 Art of Jewelry, Vol. 19, Issue 7, Page 79-87.
 Flaunt, The New Indian Express, 21 June 2020
 The Retail Jewelry Market, July–August 2014
 Adorn Magazine, Sep-Oct, 2014
 Financial Chronicle, 7 May 2014
 Indian Jeweler, Vol 6, Issue 5, Jun-July 2015
 Solitaire International, August 2020
 Jewelry News India, Sep-Oct 2017, Page 64-67
 New Woman, Sep 2017, Page 26
 The Vogue Wedding Book 2017, Page 92 
 Solitaire, November 2018, Page 78.
 Fermina Wedding Times, May 2017, Page 28-34.

References 

Indian women fashion designers
21st-century Indian designers